The Ministry of Foreign Affairs is a government ministry of the Republic of Turkey, responsible for the nation's foreign policy and international relations. Established on 2 May 1920, its primary duties are administering diplomatic missions, negotiating international treaties and agreements, and representing the Republic of Turkey at the United Nations. The ministry is headquartered in the Turkish capital of Ankara and counts on more than 200 missions as embassies, permanent representation offices and consulates general, abroad.

As of 2021, the Ministry of Foreign Affairs maintains 235 diplomatic posts worldwide. Mevlüt Çavuşoğlu is the current Minister of Foreign Affairs of Turkey, appointed on 29 August 2014.

Organization

Central Organization 

 Directorate-Generals for Bilateral Political Affairs
 Americas
 North America (USA and Canada)
 Latin America
 Africa
 East Africa
 West Africa
 East Asia and Southeast Asia
 Eastern Europe, Central Asia and Caucasia
 South Asia, Iraq and Iran
 Syria
 Middle East and North Africa
 North Africa
 Middle East
 Organisation of Islamic Cooperation
Emergency Management Center

Overseas Organization 

 Embassies
 Permanent Representation Offices
 Consulate-Generals

Representative Offices inside Turkey 

 Istanbul Representative Office
 Izmir Representative Office
 Antalya Representative Office
 Edirne Representative Office
 Gaziantep Representative Office
 Hatay Representative Office

Main issues regarding Ministry of Foreign Affairs

Diplomatic missions
In 1793, the first permanent Turkish embassy was established by Ottoman Sultan Selim III in London.

Excluding Honorary Consulates, Turkey is represented through 236 official missions, of which 142 are embassies, 12 are permanent representations, 81 are Consulate Generals and two are trade offices. With 235 missions, Turkey ranks sixth in the world after China (276), United States (273), France (267), Japan (247) and Russia (242).

Of the 236 Turkish ambassadors in service as of March 2016, 37 are women.

International Organizations 
Republic of Turkey is a member of 26 international organizations. The contact between these organizations and Turkey is maintained by the Ministry of Foreign Affairs.

Awards 

Since 1989, the Ministry awards people and organizations that have demonstrated distinguished services.

See also

 List of Ministers of Foreign Affairs of Turkey
 List of diplomatic missions of Turkey
 Foreign relations of Turkey
 Politics of Turkey
 Ministry of Foreign Affairs (Ottoman Empire)

References

External links 
  
  

Turkey, Foreign Affairs
1920 establishments in the Ottoman Empire
 
Foreign relations of Turkey
Turkey